Catherine C. Ceips (born 1955) is a former Republican member of the South Carolina Senate, representing the 46th District from the time of a special election in 2007 until the end of the term January 14, 2009. Previously she was a member of the South Carolina House of Representatives from 2003 through 2006.

Early life and education
She was born February 16, 1955, in Berkeley County and graduated from the University of South Carolina with a B.S., 1976. She married the late Richard N. Ceips on May 17, 1986.  She married Former South Carolina lawmaker Wallace Scarborough in 2009. She is a Lutheran.

Career
Her work history includes Fed. Rep. Field Dir., Congressman Joe Wilson; Fed. Rep. Field Dir., Congressman Floyd Spence; Comm. Serv. Dir., Med. Univ. of S.C.; Teacher, Beaufort and Berkeley Co. Schools; business owner.

She previously served in House 2003-06; elected in Special Election June 19, 2007, to fulfill unexpired term of Scott Richardson [R], resigned.
She was defeated 56% to 44% in the June 10, 2008, primary election for the District 46 seat by Tom Davis, who went on to win the general election over Democrat Kent Fletcher.

Ceips stated that the encouragement to run for Republican Edie Rodgers' seat came from people she had helped through the congressional office.

Memberships
She is a member of the Sea Island Ophthalmology; Beaufort County Republican Women's Club; Beaufort County GOP; Beaufort Historic Foundation; and the Open Land Trust. She supported Beaufort Little Theatre and other theatre groups.

References

External links
South Carolina Legislature - Senator Catherine C. Ceips official SC Senate website
Project Vote Smart - Senator Catherine C. Ceips (SC) profile
Follow the Money - Catherine C. Ceips
2006 2004 2002 campaign contributions

South Carolina state senators
Members of the South Carolina House of Representatives
1955 births
Living people
Women state legislators in South Carolina
21st-century American women
Women in the South Carolina State Senate